Duthie Park is a public park in the Ferryhill area of Aberdeen, Scotland located near the River Dee. It comprises  of land given to the council in 1881 by Lady Elizabeth Duthie of Ruthrieston, in memory of her uncle and of her brother. She purchased the land for £30,000 from the estate of Arthurseat.

The former Deeside Railway ran along the northern edge of the park. The park is now the starting point for the Deeside Way, a long-distance path which uses the trackbed of the railway.

History 
Duthie Park was opened in 1883 after it was gifted to the city by Miss Elizabeth Comrie Duthie in 1880 for the 'wellbeing and recreation of Aberdeen residents'.

During the 1970s Duthie Park played host to several television programmes. A round of It's A Knockout, featuring a team from Aberdeen against a team from Arbroath, was staged in Duthie Park on 10 May 1970 and transmitted on BBC1 on 13 May 1970. An episode of the children's programme Play School, transmitted Monday 3rd May 1976, visited Duthie Park in 1976.

In 2013 paddle boats were reintroduced to the park. Kayaks are regularly offered in the boating pond.The park has undergone a £5 million pound refurbishment with funding provided by the Heritage Lottery Fund and Aberdeen City Council. The original 1883 plans were consulted in order to restore some of the long-lost features. Work was completed in 2013 and the official reopening was on 30 June 2013. The refurbished park cafe was reopened in 2017 and is operated by the same company as the cafe at Hazlehead Park.

Winter Gardens 
The park is noted for the David Welch Winter Gardens with tropical and arid houses which contain the second largest collections of bromeliads and of giant cacti respectively in Great Britain (second to the Eden Project in Cornwall, England). Originally opened in 1899, the greenhouses had to be demolished and rebuilt after suffering storm damage in 1969. The gardens contain a range of plants including tree ferns, Spanish moss, anthuria, and banana trees.

Within the gardens are railings salvaged from the south side of the major bridge in the middle of the city's Union Street. These feature unusual metal cats, derived from the city coat of arms, and were saved when the side of the bridge was developed for retail units in the mid-20th century.

The Japanese Garden is an outdoor area of the Winter Gardens, opened in 1987 to commemorate the dead of Hiroshima and Nagasaki.

The gardens closed to the public due to the COVID-19 pandemic and reopened in October 2021.

Art in Duthie Park 
An interactive musical art installation, called Hornchestra, was installed in 1975. It consisted of a set of horns mounted on a 39ft. pole activated to play different notes by standing on underground foot pads and was donated by the Electrical Association for Women's Aberdeen branch. The installation was later referred to as the Honking Horns.

Images

See also

Green spaces and walkways in Aberdeen

References

Parks in Aberdeen
Inventory of Gardens and Designed Landscapes
1881 establishments in Scotland
Gardens in Aberdeen